To Love Somebody may refer to:

Music
"To Love Somebody" (song), single by the Bee Gees
To Love Somebody (album), Nina Simone's 1969 release
Got to Love Somebody, 1980 song by Sister Sledge; on album Good Times: The Very Best of the Hits & the Remixes
To Love Somebody – The Best of Michael Bolton, 2005 album listed at Michael Bolton discography

Film
To Love Somebody (2014 film), 2014 Mandarin-language romantic comedy-drama

See also 
Somebody to Love Me (disambiguation)
Somebody to Love (disambiguation)
Someone to Love (disambiguation)